Milan Basumatary (born 2 September 1997) is an Indian professional footballer who plays as a midfielder and striker for Shillong Lajong in the I-League.

Career

Early career
Born in Kokrajhar, Assam, Basumatary started playing football in his village for the Kokrajhar Football Academy as part of the Sports Authority of India. In 2012, Basumatary led the Assam U15 side to the Mir Iqbal Hussain Trophy championship, being named as the tournament's top scorer and most valuable player. After his impressive performance, Basumatary joined the All India Football Federation Regional Academy in Kalyani and the AIFF Elite Academy. In 2014, Basumatary was a part of the Aspire Academy All-Stars and earned a trial at Dutch club, PSV Eindhoven.

Shillong Lajong
In January 2016, it was announced that Basumatary signed with I-League side, Shillong Lajong. On 24 January 2016, Basumatary made his professional debut for the club against Bengaluru FC. He came on as an 87th-minute substitute for Bipin Singh as Shillong Lajong lost 3–0.

Oil India
In 2018, he was signed by Duliajan based club Oil India.

International
Basumatary has represented India at the under-16 and under-19 sides.

Career statistics

Honours
Shillong Lajong
Shillong Premier League: 2016, 2019
Bodousa Cup: 2016

References

External links 
 Shillong Lajong Football Club Profile.

1997 births
Living people
People from Kokrajhar district
Indian footballers
Shillong Lajong FC players
Oil India FC players
Association football midfielders
Association football forwards
Footballers from Assam
I-League players
India youth international footballers
AIFF Elite Academy players